Guillaume Tell (William Tell) is an opéra comique, described as a drame mise en musique, in three acts by André Grétry, The French text was by Michel-Jean Sedaine based on a play of the same name by Antoine-Marin Lemierre.

Performance history

It was first performed by the Comédie-Italienne at the first Salle Favart in Paris on 9 April 1791 and was revived on 24 May 1828 at the Salle Feydeau in a version much revised by Henri Montan Berton with music borrowed from other works of Grétry, including Amphitryon, Céphale et Procris, Aucassin et Nicolette, Callias, and Élisca, and a new libretto by Jean-Baptiste Pélissier. Grétry's Guillaume Tell disappeared from the repertoire as Rossini's 1829 opera on the same subject gained preference.

An Opéra royal de Wallonie production at the Theatre Royal in Liege in July 2013 featured Marc Laho in the title role and was conducted by Claudio Scimone.

Roles

Synopsis
The opera is set in 13th-century Switzerland. Like Rossini's later work of the same name it portrays the heroic struggle of the liberty-aspiring Swiss patriots led by Tell against the evil and oppressive Austrians under Guesler, the local governor.

Recording
Guillaume Tell, Marco Laho (Guillaume Tell), Anne-Catherine Gillet (Madame Tell), Lionel Lhote (Gessler), Orchestre et Chœurs de l'Opéra royal de Wallonie, conducted by Claudio Scimone (Musique en Wallonie, 1 CD, 2013)

References

Sources
 
 Charlton, David (1992). Guillaume Tell in The New Grove Dictionary of Opera, edited by Stanley Sadie. London: Macmillan. 
 Karl-Josef Kutsch and Leo Riemens (2003). Großes Sängerlexikon (fourth edition, in German). Munich: K. G. Saur. .
 Wild, Nicole; Charlton, David (2005). Théâtre de l'Opéra-Comique Paris: répertoire 1762-1972. Sprimont, Belgium: Editions Mardaga. .

Opéras comiques
French-language operas
Operas by André Grétry
Operas set in the 13th century
Operas set in Switzerland
1791 operas
Operas
Cultural depictions of William Tell
Music based on European myths and legends